DIN 72552 is a DIN standard for labeling the electric terminals in automotive wiring. The most frequently used labels are listed in the table below.

EN 50005
A different standard, European Norm (EN) 50005 recommends terminal numbering for general application relays (e.g. 11/12/14/A1/A2 for a SPDT relay) that may nevertheless be applied to automobiles.

References

 
 bosch-classic.com 

Automotive technologies
72552